The Committee on Public Undertakings (COPU) is a committee of selected members of parliament, constituted by the Parliament of India, for the purpose of examining the reports and accounts of the public sector undertakings (PSUs) as specified in the fourth schedule of the Rules of Procedure and Conduct of Business in Lok Sabha. This committee along with the Public Accounts committee (PAC) and the Estimates committee (EC) are the three financial standing committees of the Parliament of India.

The committee consists of twenty-two members, fifteen elected by Lok Sabha, the lower house of the Parliament, and not more than seven members of Rajya Sabha, the upper house of the Parliament. The members are elected every year from amongst its members of respective houses according to the principle of proportional representation by means of single transferable vote. The chairperson is appointed by the Lok Sabha speaker. The term of the office of the members is one year. A minister is not eligible to become a member of the committee. If a member after his election to the committee becomes a Minister, he ceases to be a member from the date of such appointment.

History 
The first proposal for a separate committee had been raised by Lanka Sundaram in 1953, stating the inadequacies Public Accounts committee (PAC) and the Estimates committee (EC) with respect to public undertakings, but the then finance minister did not relent to that idea. In May 1956. Ashok Mehta also proposed that there should be a separate committee for public undertakings, however the then finance minister held the view that the PAC and the EC were sufficient to handle the work load. By 1957, the government had agreed to form a standing sub-committee of the EC on public undertakings. In 1958, the congress formed the V. K. Krishna Menon committee. which put forward a number of recommendations intended to reconcile the accountability of public undertakings to parliament while keeping their autonomy on one hand and also ensuring efficiency on the other.

In the September 1963, the then Minister of Commerce and Industry Nityanand Kanungo, put forward a motion in the Lok Sabha proposing the formation of a separate Parliamentary Committee on Public Undertakings. In pursuance of this motion the Committee on Public Undertakings was formed with effect from May 1, 1964.

Scope and Working 
The functions of the Committee on Public Undertakings are

 To examine the reports and accounts of public undertakings specified in the fourth Schedule to the Rules of Procedure and Conduct of Business in Lok Sabha.
 To examine the reports, if any, of the Comptroller and Auditor General of India on the Public Undertakings.
 To examine, in the context of the autonomy and efficiency of the Public Undertakings whether the affairs of the Public Undertakings are being managed in accordance with sound business principles and prudent commercial practices.

The committee from time to time takes up for examination as such any PSU or subjects related to them as they may deem fit and which are within their terms of reference. The dep or Undertaking concerned is asked to furnish necessary material relating to those subjects for information of the Members of the Committee. The Committee may from time to time appoint one or more Study Groups for carrying out detailed examination of various subjects.

Current composition 

Keys:         = 22 members

List of Public Undertakings 
The scope of COPU is limited to the undertakings specified in the fourth Schedule to the Rules of Procedure and Conduct of Business in Lok Sabha. They are as follows :

Probes in recent years

BSNL Salary ratio (2014) 
The Committee on Public Undertakings noted in its report: "The staff cost was about Rs.13,406 crore in 2011-12, that is almost 50 per cent of its revenue, which is abnormally on the higher side as compared to private companies whose expenditure is stated to be in the range of 5-10 per cent."

ONGC Videsh Ltd (2014) 
Based on the performance audit done by C&AG presented in report no. 28 for the year 2010-11, the COPU had the following findings -"Due to unrealistic estimation of reserves/production, OVL has suffered a huge loss of Rs.1182.14 crore during the period 2008-09 and 2009-10. Since OVL did not chose to farm-out part of its stake to a local partner, the entire loss has been borne out by it" Following up in August 2015, COPU stated - "Except reiterating its earlier reply OVL has not offered any justification for its ill-conceived decision not to farm-out part of its stake in IEC to local Russian firms/ entities and its unrealistic estimation of oil reserves and production targets"

Chairpersons

Chairpersons of the committee till date

Longest serving chairpersons of COPU

Reports Published 
The committee since inception has presented 604 reports till date. Of these, 301 are original Reports, and 303 are reports on action taken by the Government on the original reports of the committee. Out of 301 original reports, 37 are in the nature of horizontal studies on various aspects of working of the public undertakings.

See also 

17th Lok Sabha
Estimates Committee
Public Accounts Committee (India)
Standing Committee on Defence (India)
Standing Committee on Finance
List of Indian parliamentary committees

References

External links 
 Rules of Procedure and Conduct of Business in Lok Sabha 2014
National Highway Authority of India report - Aug 2018
BSNL report - Apr 2014
ONGC Videsh Limited report - Feb 2014

Committees of the Parliament of India